India have participated in the ABU Radio Song Festival five times. The Indian broadcaster, All India Radio, has been the organiser of the Indian entry since the country's debut in the contest in 2012.

History

2012
All India Radio is one of the founder members in the ABU Radio Song Festivals, having participated in the very first ABU Radio Song Festival 2012. India submitted two songs for the first festival in Seoul, South Korea, these were Bimblotica with "I'm Girl" and Mathur Lakshmi Keshava & Group with "Vayam Atra Sanjataha Asmakam Punyam". Neither of the two submissions from India were selected to participate in the 15 song final.

2014
In 2014 All India Radio submitted two songs to participate in the festival in Colombo, Sri Lanka. Both songs were revealed on 18 March 2014, the submissions were Abhijith Kishen with "Be The Change" and Mangka Mayanglambam with "Tamla Loibi Napom". Mangka Mayanglambam was selected to perform in the televised show the first Indian entrant to achieve this, Abhijith was however not selected to perform in Sri Lanka.

2015
India participated in the ABU Radio Song Festival for a third time in 2015. Two songs were submitted to represent the country in India, Padavi Deshmukh with "Voice of Women" and Peepal Tree with "Nayi Khushi". Peepal Tree were selected to represent India in Yangon, Myanmar along with 13 other songs from across the Asia Pacific Region.

Participation overview 
Table key

See also 
 India in the ABU TV Song Festival

References 

Countries at the ABU Song Festival